Tiếng gọi thanh niên, or Thanh niên hành khúc ("March of the Youths") and originally the March of the Students is a famous song of the musician Lưu Hữu Phước.

Its lyric was modified to make the anthem of State of Vietnam from 1948 to 1955 and Republic of Vietnam (South Vietnam) from 1955 to 1975, with the name Tiếng Gọi Công Dân ("Call to the Citizens"). This move was strongly protested by the original author Lưu Hữu Phước, who was culture minister of the Việt Cộng-led Provisional Revolutionary Government during the Vietnam War.

The original version is the official one used in the Socialist Republic of Vietnam. The modified version is used by anti-communist Vietnamese expatriates.

History

Original version
The anthem was originally named La Marche des Étudiants (March of the Students), composed by Lưu Hữu Phước and written by Mai Văn Bộ in late 1939, and first adopted by a student club. In 1941, it became the anthem of the Indochina Students General Association, Phước renamed the anthem as Tiếng Gọi Thanh Niên (Call to the Youths), the lyrics was rewritten in Vietnamese and divided into three verses. The first verse was written by Lưu Hữu Phước and Mai Văn Bộ in 1941, and secretly spread until 1945, the second verse (Tiếng Gọi Sinh Viên, Call to the Students) was written by Lê Khắc Thiều and Đặng Ngọc Tốt in late 1941, and published in 1943, the third verse was written by Hoàng Mai Lưu on April 4, 1945, and published before the August Revolution. In 1945 it became the anthem of the Vanguard Youth, the lyrics were small modified and became known as Tiếng Gọi Thanh Niên or Thanh Hiên Hành Khúc.

Thanh Niên Hành Khúc (1948–1956) and Tiếng Gọi Công Dân (1956–1975)

In 1948, the Provisional Central Government of Vietnam adopted the song as the national anthem. The song was later modified with the name changed to Tiếng Gọi Công Dân  (Call to the Citizens) or Công Dân Hành Khúc (March of the Citizens), and became the official national anthem of South Vietnam. Thanh niên Hành Khúc was first adopted as the national anthem by the Provisional Central Government of Vietnam (Pre-government of the State of Vietnam. 1948–1949) on 14 June 1948, and it was inherited as a national anthem by the State of Vietnam (1949–1955) and the Republic of Vietnam (1955–1975). The lyrics of Thanh Niên Hành Khúc were revised by former President Ngo Dinh Diem in 1956.

The original author Lưu Hữu Phước made a strong criticism against South Vietnam's regimes use of the song. In 1949 he made a protesting letter. Later the Voice of Vietnam made sporadically broadcast of Lưu Hữu Phước's criticisms.

After the war (1975–present)
After 1975, the original version and name (Tiếng Gọi Thanh Niên) of the song was performed as the official version in the Socialist Republic of Vietnam.

The anti-communist expatriates continued to use the revised version and dubbed it as "Anthem of Free Vietnam".

Lyrics

La Marche des Étudiants – March of the Students (1939)
(French version)
Étudiants ! Du sol l'appel tenace
Pressant et fort, retentit dans l'espace.
Des côtes d'Annam aux ruines d'Angkor,
À travers les monts, du sud jusqu'au nord,
Une voix monte ravie:
Servir la chère Patrie !
Toujours sans reproche et sans peur
Pour rendre l'avenir meilleur.
La joie, la ferveur, la jeunesse
Sont pleines de fermes promesses.

Chorus.
Te servir, chère Indochine,
Avec cœur et discipline,
C'est notre but, c'est notre loi
Et rien n'ébranle notre foi !

Tiếng Gọi Thanh Niên – Call to the Youths 
Verse I.
Này anh em ơi! Tiến lên đến ngày giải phóng.Đồng lòng cùng nhau ta đi sá gì thân sống.Cùng nhau ta tuốt gươm, cùng nhau ta đứng lên.Thù kia chưa trả xong thì ta luôn cố bền.Lầm than bao năm ta đau khổ biết mấy.Vàng đá gấm vóc, loài muông thú cướp lấy.Loài nó chúng lấy máu đào chúng ta.Làm ta gian nan, cửa nhà tan rã.Bầu máu, nhắt tời đó, càng thêm nóng sôi.Ta quyết thề phá tan quân dã man rồi.
Chorus
Vung gươm lên, ta quyết đi tời cùng!Vung gươm lên, ta thề đem hết lòng.Tiến lên đồng tiến, sá chi đời sống.Chớ quên rằng ta là giống Lạc Hồng!
Verse II.
Này sinh viên ơi! Đứng lên đáp lời sông núi.Đồng lòng cùng đi đi đi mở đường khai lối.Kià non sông nước xưa, truyền muôn năm chớ quên.Nào anh em Bắc Nam cùng nhau ta kết đoàn.Hồn thanh xuân như gương trong sáng.Đừng tiếc máu nóng, tài xin ráng.Thời khó, thế khó, khó làm yếu ta.Dù muôn chông gai, vững lòng chi sá.Đường mới, kíp phóng mắt, nhìn xa bốn phương.Tung cánh hồn thiếu niên, ai đó can trường.
Chorus
Sinh viên ơi, mau tiến lên dưới cờ.Anh em ơi, quật cường nay đến giờ.Tiến lên cùng tiến, gió tung nguồn sống.Cháy trong lòng ta ngàn mớ lửa hồng.
Verse III.
Này thanh niên ơi! Tiến lên đến ngày giải phóng.Đồng lòng cùng đi đi đi sá gì thân sống.Nhìn non sông nát tan, thù nung tâm chí cao.Nhìn muôn dân khóc than, hờn sôi trong máu đào.Liều thân xông pha, ta tranh đấu.Cờ nghĩa phấp phới, vàng pha máu.Cùng tiến, quét hết những loài dã man.Hầu đem quê hương thoát vòng u ám.Thề quyết, lấy máu nóng mà rửa oán chung.Muôn thuở vì núi sông nêu tiếng anh hùng.
Chorus 
Anh em ơi, mau tiến lên dưới cờ.Sinh viên ơi, quật cường nay đến giờ.Tiến lên cùng tiến, gió tung nguồn sống.Cháy trong lòng ta ngàn mớ lửa hồng.

Thanh Niên Hành Khúc – Song of the Youths (1948–1955)

Vietnamese lyrics

Này thanh niên ơi! Đứng lên đáp lời sông núi.
Đồng lòng cùng đi đi đi mở đường khai lối.
Vì non sông nước xưa truyền muôn năm chớ quên.
Nào anh em Bắc Nam cùng nhau ta kết đoàn.
Hồn thanh xuân như gương trong sáng.
Đừng tiếc máu nóng tài xỉn ráng.
Thời khó thế khó khó làm yếu ta.
Dầu muôn chông gai vững lòng chi sá.
Đường mới kiếp phóng mắt nhìn xa bốn phương.
Tung cánh hồn thiếu niên ai đó can trường.

Thanh niên ơi! Ta quyết đi đến cùng.
Thanh niên ơi! Ta nguyền đem hết lòng.
Tiến lên, đồng tiến, vẻ vang đời sống.
Chớ quên rằng ta là giống Lạc Hồng.

English translation

Youth of Vietnam, arise! And heed our Country's call
Single in heart let us open the way; let us keep in mind
Our millenary history. From North to South, brothers,
Let us unite. Our young hearts are crystal pure;
Unsparing of our ardent blood, let our efforts increase.
No danger, no obstacle can hold us back.
Despite a thousand trials our courage is unshaken.
On this new road our eyes embrace the horizon,
Our soaring youthful spirit is undauntable.
Youth of Vietnam, to the very end! This we resolve.
To give ourselves completely, this we vow!
Forward together for a glorious life,
Remember, we are the generation of the Lac-Hong.

Source: National Anthems of the World (2nd and revised ed.), 1963.

Tiếng Gọi Công Dân – Call to the Citizens (1956–1975)

Vietnamese lyrics

Này Công Dân ơi! Quốc gia đến ngày giải phóng.
Đồng lòng cùng đi hi sinh tiếc gì thân sông.
Vì tương lai Quốc Dân, cùng xông pha khói tên,
Làm sao cho núi sông từ nay luôn vững bền.
Dù cho thây phơi trên gươm giáo,
Thù nước, lấy máu đào đem báo.
Nòi giống lúc biến phải cần giải nguy,
Người Công Dân luôn vững bền tâm trí.
Hùng tráng quyết chiến đấu làm cho khắp nơi
Vang tiếng người nước Nam cho đến muôn đời!
Công Dân ơi! Mau hiến thân dưới cờ!
Công Dân ơi! Mau làm cho cõi bờ
Thoát cơn tàn phá, vẻ vang nòi giống
Xứng danh Nghìn năm giòng giống Lạc Hồng!

English translation

Oh citizens! Our country has reached the day of liberation.
Of one heart we go forth, sacrificing ourselves with no regrets.
For the future of the people, advance into battle,
Let us make this land eternally strong.
Should our bodies be left on the battlefields,
The nation will be avenged with our crimson blood
In troublesome times, the Race will be rescued,
We the People remain resolute in our hearts and minds.
Courageously we will fight such that everywhere,
The Glory of the Vietnamese forever resounds!
Oh citizens! Hasten to offer yourselves under the flag!
Oh citizens! Hasten to defend this land,
Escape from destruction, and bask our race in glory, 
Make its name shine, forever worthy of our forebears!

References

External links
Lưu Hữu Phước's original version, performed by Choir of Voice of Vietnam
"Ethnic Music" Room ("Words" is Japanese version only)
Quốc kỳ, Quốc ca (Vietnamese language only)
Sheet music of Tiếng Gọi Thanh Niên
Tiếng Gọi Công Dân
Committee for Protection of the Flag of the Republic of Vietnam

South Vietnam
National anthems
Historical national anthems
Vietnamese songs
National symbols of Vietnam
Asian anthems
National anthem compositions in F major